Bethers Axel Seaborg (July 30, 1840 – November 23, 1923) was an American politician in the state of Washington. He served in the Washington State Senate from 1889 to 1891.

References

1840 births
1923 deaths
Republican Party Washington (state) state senators